Mackley is a surname. Notable people with the surname include:

Alan Mackley (1913–1982), Australian cricket umpire
Arthur Mackley (1865–1926), English actor and film director
Garnet Mackley (1883–1886), New Zealand businessman and politician
Geoff Mackley, New Zealand photographer
George Mackley (1900–1983), English wood engraver
Ian Mackley (born 1942), British diplomat
Shane Mackley, Australian rugby league player

See also
Carl Mackley Houses, apartment complex in Philadelphia, Pennsylvania